Cariacothrix is a genus of ciliates in the subphylum Intramacronucleata. It contains only one species, Cariacothrix caudata, and is the only genus in the monotypic family Cariacotrichidae, order Cariacotrichida, and class Cariacotrichea.

References

Intramacronucleata
Monotypic SAR supergroup taxa
Ciliate classes